Chloropipo is a genus of passerine birds in the family Pipridae.
 
It contains the following species:
 Yellow-headed manakin (Chloropipo flavicapilla)
 Jet manakin (Chloropipo unicolor)

References

 
Bird genera
Taxa named by Jean Cabanis
Taxa named by Ferdinand Heine